The 1996 United States Senate election in New Jersey was held on November 5, 1996. Incumbent Democratic U.S. Senator Bill Bradley decided to retire instead of seeking a fourth term. The seat was won by Democratic congressman Robert Torricelli.

Democratic primary

Candidates
Robert Torricelli, U.S. Representative from Englewood

Declined
Bill Bradley, incumbent Senator since 1979

Results

Republican primary

Candidates
 Richard DuHaime, Passaic County Freeholder
 Dick LaRossa, State Senator from Ewing
 Dick Zimmer, U.S. Representative from Delaware Township

Campaign
Zimmer was the front-runner from the start, getting endorsements from Republican leaders across the state, including Gov. Christine Todd Whitman. Both DuHaime, a pro-life candidate, and La Rossa, a pro-gun candidate, attempted to portray Zimmer as too liberal, but Zimmer largely ignored his opponents and won the primary easily.

Results

General election

Candidates
 Robert Torricelli (D), U.S. Representative
 Dick Zimmer (R), U.S. Representative

Campaign
Democratic U.S. Representative Robert Torricelli won his party's primary unopposed, and Republican U.S. Representative Dick Zimmer won his party's nomination easily. Torricelli defeated Zimmer in the general election by 10 points, while President Bill Clinton simultaneously carried New Jersey by almost 18% in his reelection bid. Third-party and independent candidates carried 4.8% of the vote.

Like other Democratic candidates around the country, Torricelli tried to tie "Zig-Zag Zimmer" to House Speaker Newt Gingrich and attacked him for flip flopping on his positions on issues like Medicare, gun control and an increase in the minimum wage during the campaign. Zimmer tried to cast his opponent as a tax-and-spend liberal with ethical flaws. Military morale was also a part of the campaign.

Polling

Results

See also 
 1996 United States Senate elections

References 

New Jersey
1996
United States Senate